Imperatori is a surname. Notable people with the surname include:

Alexandre Imperatori (born 1987), Swiss racing driver
Luigi Imperatori (1844–1900), Swiss Roman Catholic theologian
Micaela Imperatori (born 1972), Italian rhythmic gymnast